Germany–Saudi Arabia relations refers to the international relations between Germany and Saudi Arabia.

History 
Relations between Saudi Arabia and Germany were formed as early as 1929, with the signing of a treaty between the Weimar Republic and the Kingdom of Hejaz and Nejd. The relations between the Federal Republic of Germany and Saudi Arabia were established in 1954.

Controversies

Funding of mosques 

Saudi Arabia funds the construction and maintenance of several mosques in Germany. Several politicians have expressed concern that the Saudi-funded mosques are a breeding ground for Islamic extremism.

Arms exports 
Germany was one of the top weapons exporters to Saudi Arabia, with an export volume of 450 million Euros in the third fiscal quarter of 2017. In 2018, after the murder of Jamal Khashoggi, Germany halted arms exports to Saudi Arabia, which has strained relations.

Diaspora

German diaspora in Saudi Arabia 
There is a small community of Germans working in Saudi Arabia, as a number of German companies have a presence in the kingdom. The German International School in Jeddah and German International School in Riyadh cater to the educational needs of the children of diplomats, as well as the diaspora.

Saudi diaspora in Germany 
There is a small Saudi diaspora in Germany, which includes women refugees who have fled the kingdom due to its patriarchical laws.

Cultural ties 
The 2019 film The Perfect Candidate is the first example of a major Saudi-German coproduction.

See also 
 Foreign relations of Germany
 Foreign relations of Saudi Arabia

References 

Germany–Saudi Arabia relations
Saudi Arabia
Bilateral relations of Saudi Arabia